Roderick Duane Smith (born May 15, 1970) is an American former professional football player who was a wide receiver for 14 seasons for the Denver Broncos of the National Football League (NFL).  He played college football for the Missouri Southern Lions.  He was originally signed by the Broncos as an undrafted free agent and played his entire career with the team.  's offseason, his 849 career receptions and 11,389 receiving yards ranked him 34th and 34th all-time.

Personal life
At Arkansas Senior High School in Texarkana, Arkansas, Smith lettered two years in football and basketball, and one year in baseball. As a senior in football, he was All-League, All-Area, and All-State. Outside of football Rod Smith has three kids (Roderick Smith Jr., Devin Smith, and Vanessa Webb). He is a business entrepreneur as he has expressed in many interviews. Some of these have featured his kids speaking about their father's accomplishments on and off the field.

College career
Smith enjoyed a stellar career at Missouri Southern State University, finishing with conference records in career receiving yards (3,043) and touchdowns (34). He also broke the school’s reception record (153), and was named first-team All-America by AP, Kodak, Football Gazette and NCAA Division II sports information directors after his senior year. In his final season, Smith caught 63 passes for 986 yards and 13 touchdowns, and was a finalist for the Harlon Hill Trophy, given annually to the top football player at the Division II level. He was named Missouri Southern’s Outstanding Graduate in 1994 after completing his collegiate studies with three degrees, in economics and finance, general business, as well as marketing and management.

Professional career
After the 1994 draft, Smith went undrafted and was signed by the Denver Broncos as a free agent. His first NFL catch was a last-minute 43-yard touchdown from John Elway in a 38–31 win against the Washington Redskins on September 17, 1995. In fourteen seasons as an NFL player, Smith had eight seasons of at least 1,000 receiving yards. He had two seasons of at least 100 receptions (: 100; : 113). In 2000, Smith and teammate Ed McCaffrey became only the second wide receiver duo on the same team to each gain 100 receptions in the same season (with Herman Moore and Brett Perriman). His 113 receptions in 2001 led the league. He was a starting wide receiver of the Broncos' back-to-back Super Bowl championships in 1997 and 1998. In the Broncos' 34–19 win in Super Bowl XXXIII, Smith had 5 receptions for 152 yards, tied for 5th most in Super Bowl history, including an 80-yard touchdown reception. He was a finalist for the Walter Payton Man of the Year Award in 2004.

A hip injury that he suffered in 2006 required a complete hip replacement. On December 28, 2007 it was revealed that Smith needed another hip surgery, possibly ending his career. He was placed on the reserve/retired list on February 15, 2008, and announced his formal retirement from professional football on July 24, 2008 in a press conference at the team's Dove Valley headquarters.

Smith finished his career as the Broncos all-time leader in receptions (849), receiving yards (11,389), and touchdown receptions (68).  Also an accomplished punt returner, Smith returned 53 punts for 647 yards and a touchdown.  His 12.2 yards per return average ranked him 2nd all time among Broncos players with at least 50 punt returns.  With two Super Bowls, three Pro Bowls, and a controversy-free career noted for professionalism, Smith left the Broncos as one of the most well-loved players of all time. In May 2012 it was announced that he would be inducted into the Broncos Ring of Fame in his first year of eligibility for the honor. The induction ceremony took place on Sunday, Sep 23, at halftime of the Broncos' home game against the Houston Texans at Sports Authority Field at Mile High.

Awards and accomplishments
First undrafted player to reach 10,000 receiving yards, and the 24th in history to eclipse that figure.
Has the most receiving yards (11,389) and touchdown receptions (68) of any undrafted player in NFL history.
Ranks second on the most receptions (849) by any undrafted player in NFL history, behind Wes Welker.
Holds Broncos franchise records in career receptions, receiving yards and touchdown catches.
Ranks first on Denver's all-time yards from scrimmage list.
Only the sixth player in NFL history to have 100 receptions against at least 3 teams (Kansas City Chiefs, San Diego Chargers and Oakland Raiders).
AFC Offensive Player of the Week (week 15; 12/17/05 against the Buffalo Bills at Buffalo).
Associated Press second-team All-Pro (2000, 2001).
Football Digest first-team All-Pro (2000, 2001).
USA Today first-team All-Pro (2000).
College and Pro Newsweekly first-team All-Pro (2000).
Pro Football Weekly All-AFC (2000, 2001).
Division II Hall of Fame (Inducted in 2008)
College Football Hall of Fame (Inducted in 2009)
Denver Broncos Ring of Fame (Inducted in 2012)

Franchise records
's NFL off-season, Rod Smith held at least 11 Broncos franchise records, including:
 Receptions: career (849), season (113 in 2001)
 Receiving Yds: career (11,389), playoffs (860)
 Receiving TDs: career (68), playoffs (6)
 Total TDs: career (71)
 Yds from Scrimmage: career (11,737)
 All Purpose Yds: career (12,488)
 Games with 1+ TD scored: career (66)
 Seasons with 1000+ receiving yards: career (8)

References

1970 births
Living people
American Conference Pro Bowl players
American football wide receivers
College Football Hall of Fame inductees
Denver Broncos players
Missouri Southern Lions football players
People from Texarkana, Arkansas
Players of American football from Arkansas
10,000 receiving yards club
Ed Block Courage Award recipients